Jacobs Peak is a peak,  high, surmounting the northern end of the ridge which stands on the west side of Ragotzkie Glacier, in the Britannia Range, Antarctica. It was named by the Advisory Committee on Antarctic Names for John D. Jacobs, a U.S. exchange observer at Vostok Station in 1964.

References

Mountains of Oates Land